The Old Town Sebastian Historic District West is a United States historic district (designated as such on January 6, 2004) located in Sebastian, Florida. The district is bounded by Palmetto Ave, Lake and Main Streets. It contains 15 historic buildings.

References

External links

 Indian River County listings at National Register of Historic Places

National Register of Historic Places in Indian River County, Florida
Historic districts on the National Register of Historic Places in Florida
Geography of Indian River County, Florida